Alucita ordubadi is a moth of the family Alucitidae. It is found in Azerbaijan.

References

Moths described in 2000
Alucitidae
Moths of Asia
Moths of Europe